Tillandsia geissei is a plant species in the genus Tillandsia. This species is endemic to Chile.

References
Chilean Bromeliaceae: diversity, distribution and evaluation of conservation status (Published online: 10 March 2009)

geissei
Endemic flora of Chile